Franck Kore (born 16 May 1995) is a French professional footballer who plays as a forward for Swiss club Lausanne Ouchy.

Career
Kore started his senior career with Tours. After that, he played for JA Drancy, Septemvri Simitli, and R.U.S. Rebecquoise. In 2018, he signed for R.E. Virton in the Belgian First Division B, where he has made forty-seven appearances and scored sixteen goals.

On 19 July 2021, he signed with Luxembourger club Swift Hesperange.

References

External links 
 French Football Federation profile
 Franck Koré (Virton) played with Rabiot and Lemar 
 Franck Koré explose à l'Excelsior Virton
 Franck Koré (Virton): "I don't ask myself any more questions" 
 Virton: Franck Koré, the revelation of this start to the season

1995 births
Footballers from Abidjan
Ivorian emigrants to France
Living people
French footballers
Association football forwards
France youth international footballers
Tours FC players
JA Drancy players
FC Septemvri Simitli players
R.E. Virton players
FC Swift Hesperange players
FC Stade Lausanne Ouchy players
Championnat National 3 players
Championnat National 2 players
Second Professional Football League (Bulgaria) players
Challenger Pro League players
Luxembourg National Division players
Swiss Challenge League players
French expatriate footballers
Expatriate footballers in Bulgaria
French expatriate sportspeople in Bulgaria
Expatriate footballers in Belgium
French expatriate sportspeople in Belgium
Expatriate footballers in Luxembourg
French expatriate sportspeople in Luxembourg
Expatriate footballers in Switzerland
French expatriate sportspeople in Switzerland